The Pakistan People's Party (PPP) is a centre-left, social-democratic political party in Pakistan. It is currently the third largest party in the National Assembly and second largest in the Senate of Pakistan. The party was founded in 1967 in Lahore, when a number of prominent left-wing politicians in the country joined hands against the military dictatorship of President Ayub Khan, under the leadership of Zulfikar Ali Bhutto. Affiliated with Socialist International, the PPP's platform has formerly been socialist, and its stated priorities continue to include transforming Pakistan into a social-democratic state, promoting secular and egalitarian values, establishing social justice, and maintaining a strong military. The party, alongside the Pakistan Muslim League-Nawaz and the Pakistan Tehreek-e-Insaf, is one of the three largest political parties of Pakistan.

Since its foundation in 1967, it has been a major centre-left force in the country and the party's leadership has been dominated by the members of the Bhutto family. Its centre of power lies in the southern province of Sindh. The People's Party has been voted into power on five separate occasions (1970, 1977, 1988, 1993 and 2008), while on four occasions (1990, 1997, 2002 and 2013) it emerged as the largest opposition party. There have been a total of four prime ministers from PPP.

The PPP dominated the politics of Pakistan during the 1970s, suffering a temporary decline during the military dictatorship of Zia-ul-Haq. After the re-establishment of democracy in 1988 following Zia's death, a two-party system developed, consisting of the People's Party and the Islamic Democratic Alliance, later succeeded by the Nawaz League. The party served as the principal opposition to the Pervez Musharraf-led military government from 1999 to 2008.

The party conceded defeat during the 2013 general election, losing swathes of support in the Punjab Province where most of its base was lost to the emerging PTI, although it retained its provincial government in Sindh. In the 2018 general election, for the first time in history, the party was able to neither form the government nor emerge as the largest party in opposition.

History

Foundation 
The Pakistan People's Party (PPP) was launched at its founding convention held in Lahore on 30 November and 1 December 1967. At the same meeting, former Foreign Minister Zulfikar Ali Bhutto was elected as its chairman. Among the expressed goals of the party were the establishment of an "egalitarian democracy" and the "application of socialistic ideas to realize economic and social justice". A more immediate task was the struggle against the dictatorship of General Ayub Khan.

Left-wing beginnings 

In the 1970s, Ayub Khan's policies were seen by many to have nourished the capitalist class at the expense of ordinary people, evidenced by the drastic increase in income inequality and poverty. In April 1968, Dr. Mahbub ul Haq, the then Chief Economist of the Planning Commission reported that 22 families controlled 66% of the industries and owned an 87% share in the country's banking and insurance industries. Due to the Indo-Pakistani War of 1965, the economy collapsed, and investment growth in Pakistan saw a 20% decline in following years. Although Pakistan was not able to win the war of 1965, victory was propagated by the military establishment. Under pressure from the Soviet Union, both India and Pakistan signed the Tashkent Declaration in Uzbekistan. The Tashkent Declaration shocked the people of Pakistan due to their expectation of a Pakistani victory. Ayub Khan fiercely defended the declaration and called it in the best interest of the people. This led to a confrontation between Ayub Khan and his Foreign Minister Zulifqar Ali Bhutto which led to the resignation of the latter and the eventual creation of the People's Party. Bhutto went on to accuse Ayub of "losing the war on the negotiating table." Opposition parties decided to protest against the declaration, but the state responded by imposing bans upon public gatherings and arresting activists. The resignation of Bhutto further angered the public, who were growing ever more discontent with President Khan's government. On 5 February 1966, Sheikh Mujibur Rahman announced his program of regional autonomy for East Bengal at a news conference.

Bhutto's passionate stance against Ayub's regime was hailed by leftist groups, leading him to attempt finding a position for himself in the National Awami Party. Unable to find a suitable position for himself in the NAP, Bhutto decided to launch his own political party. On 30 November 1967, a convention was held in Lahore, where democratic socialists and left-wing intellectuals gathered to meet with Bhutto at the residence of Dr. Mubashir Hassan, and the Pakistan People's Party was formed. The newly formed party's members elected Zulfikar Ali Bhutto as its first chairman. Its manifesto, titled 'Islam is our Religion; Democracy is our Politics; Socialism is our Economy; Power Lies with the People' was written by Bengali communist J. A. Rahim, and published on 9 December 1967. The main objective of the party was to establish a more classless society adopting a clear socialist programme of nationalisation and reducing economic inequality. The document declared that "Only socialism, which creates equal opportunities for all, protects [people] from exploitation, removes the barriers of class distinction, and is capable of establishing economic and social justice. Socialism is the highest expression of democracy and its logical fulfillment".

According to Philip E. Jones, the People's Party had three main ideological camps: Marxists, Islamic socialists and the landed elite. In 1968, when Ayub Khan was celebrating his government's 'Decade of Development', demonstrations erupted all over the country. In the same year, spontaneous students' movements erupted throughout the country, largely due to unemployment and economic hardship which saw the beginning of the 1968 movement in Pakistan. In the same time, ideological differences emerged within the NAP, which led to a major split between the pro-Soviet and pro-China factions. The pro-Soviet faction, led by Wali Khan, proposed a parliamentary route to power, whereas the pro-China faction led by Moulana Bhashani advocated for a peasant revolution to overthrow Ayub Khan's regime. The vacuum on the left generated by the disunity of the National Awami Party was effectively filled by Bhutto's People's Party as a united front of opposition to Ayub Khan. Zulfiqar Ali Bhutto, being shrewder in sensing the mood of the mass movement, had embarked upon the 'need for socialism' and other radical slogans. This PPP programme connected with the masses' moods, aspirations and sentiments; the PPP became the largest party of the masses in the history of Pakistan, almost overnight. The first activists and cadres who gave the PPP a foothold and standing were from the different Maoist groups and other scattered left activists. These groups were disillusioned and frustrated by the traditional Stalinist leadership of the left.In 1968, a massive public-relations program was launched by the party, beginning in the Punjab. Bhutto's program directly targeted the country's poverty-stricken masses. The left-wing oriented slogan 'Land to the Landless' proved to be popular amongst the peasants and labour-force, as the party promised not only to abolish the feudal system, but also to redistribute land. The working-classes quickly flocked to the party, believing it to be a party dedicated to the destruction of capitalism in the country. The young university students and teachers who often bore the brunt of Ayub Khan's dictatorial regime during his decade-long rule were promised a better future with better educational and career opportunities. Many other members of society who had felt stifled and repressed by the press-control and heavy censorship practised by the authoritarian Khan regime also joined the new party, whose manifesto also attracted the country's numerous minorities. The continuous contentions forced Ayub Khan to resign from the presidency in 1969, leading to the imposition of martial law by Army Commander General Yahya Khan, after he promised to hold elections within two years. During this time, the Peoples Party intensified its support in West Pakistan, organizing itself and gaining support from poor masses in West Pakistan.

1970 general election and 1971 war 

Ayub Khan succumbed to political pressure on 26 March 1969 and handed power to the Commander-in-Chief of the Pakistan Army, General Agha Muhammad Yahya Khan. President Yahya Khan imposed martial law and the 1962 Constitution was abrogated. On 31 March 1970, President Yahya Khan announced a Legal Framework Order (LFO) which called for direct elections to a unicameral legislature. Many in the West feared the East wing's demand for provincial autonomy. The purpose of the LFO was to secure the future constitution which would be written after the election in order for it to include safeguards such as preserving Pakistan's territorial integrity and Islamic ideology. In the background of recent political developments, the People's Party decided to hold its National Conference. This was to be held in Lahore from 4–6 April 1969 but due to the imposition of Martial law, it was called off. Later from 1–3 July 1970, the first conference was held in Hala Sharif, Sindh. At this historical conference which is known as the Hala Conference, there were two different opinions on participating in the upcoming general election. Some argued that the Party should not take part in elections but rather adopt methods of revolutionary insurrection to take power, whereas others emphasized the importance of partaking in parliamentary democracy. In the end, the decision to participate in the elections was taken. On 4 January 1970, Z.A. Bhutto officially launched his election campaign by addressing a public meeting at Nishtar Park, Karachi then conducted public meetings at Rawalpindi's Liaquat Bagh and NWFP. By the 1970s, the Pakistan Peoples Party had become the leading party of the Left in Pakistan, publishing its ideas in newspapers such as Nusrat, Fatah, and Mussawat. During the 1970 General Election, the People's Party dominated West Pakistani seats, defeating far-right and other right-of-centre forces in West-Pakistan, However, the story in East Pakistan was altogether different, where the Awami League had dominated and the People's Party had failed to win a single seat (likewise, the Awami League had also failed to make a breakthrough in West Pakistan). The Awami League secured 160 seats out of the total 300 seats in the National Assembly, whereas the People's Party came second with 81 seats.

The results gave the Awami League the constitutional right to form a government. However, Bhutto contested Rahman's mandate to form government in West Pakistan due to his party not having won a single seat there. Instead, Bhutto proposed the One Unit scheme, with two separate prime ministers for West and East Pakistan. This proposal was rejected by Sheikh Mujibur Rahman, whose Six Point programme for a more federal Pakistan was also rejected by Bhutto. On 3 March 1971, the two leaders, along with President General Yahya Khan, met in Dacca to try and resolve the constitutional crisis. After their discussions yielded no satisfactory results, Sheikh Mujibur Rahman called for a nationwide strike. Bhutto, fearing a civil war, sent his trusted companion, Mubashir Hassan to convey a message to Rahman, who agreed to meet Bhutto once again. The two leaders agreed to form a coalition government with Rahman as prime minister and Bhutto as president. However, the military was unaware of these developments, and Bhutto increased his pressure on Rahman to reach a decision. After the launch of military action in East Pakistan (see Operations Searchlight and Barisal), the situation became unreconcilable .

Bhutto and his supporters criticised Yayha Khan's handling of the situation which led to the arrests of Bhutto and members of the People's Party, alongside Mujibur Rahman in Adiala Jail. This was followed by Indian intervention in East Bengal, cementing the defeat of the Pakistan Armed Forces, and the independence of Bangladesh.

Post-war politics 

As result of Pakistan's defeat by India in Indo-Pakistani War of 1971, General Yahya Khan was forced to resign. On 20 December, he was taken to the President House in Rawalpindi, where he took over two positions from Yahya Khan, one as president and the other as first civilian Chief Martial Law Administrator. Thus, he was the first civilian Chief Martial Law Administrator of the dismembered Pakistan. By the time Bhutto had assumed control of what remained of Pakistan, the nation was completely isolated, angered, and demoralized. After becoming president, Bhutto in his first statement to foreign media correspondents said: Let us forget the past. We have made terrible mistakes and Pakistan is in a mess—the worst crisis in our history. But we have been given a terrible bashing by the Western press and I ask you now to please get off our backs while we put our house in order.

Bhutto era 
Bhutto vowed to build a new Pakistan. On 2 January 1972 Bhutto announced the nationalisation of all major industries, including iron and steel, heavy engineering, heavy electricals, petrochemicals, cement and public utilities. A new labour policy was announced increasing the power of trade unions. Although he came from a feudal background himself, Bhutto announced reforms limiting land ownership and a government take-over of more than a million acres to distribute to landless peasants. More than 2,000 civil servants were dismissed on charges of corruption. He successfully negotiated the return of 93,000 prisoners of war and settlement with India, whilst kicking off the country's nuclear programme in January 1972. The promulgation of the 1973 constitution put Pakistan on the road to parliamentary democracy. In the People's Party's first budget of 1972–3, health and education were nationalised, with a record 42.3 percent of the total budget being allocated for them.

The National Assembly of Pakistan approved the new constitution on 10 April 1973 and it came into effect from 14 August 1973, the day Bhutto became Prime Minister of Pakistan. Bhutto initiated different reforms like expanding the school network to slums and small villages, creating basic health facilities, land reforms and housing schemes. However, the Party's measures fell through as a result of 1970s global economic recession, the 1973 oil crisis, and the failure of reforms resulted into rising inflation. The letter of credit of Pakistan was rejected by foreign banks and a massive outflow of capital was seen from the country. Dr Mubashar Hassan, then-finance minister wrote in a note to all ministers, special assistants, provincial chief ministers and governors: "We have been in office for more than six months. Many decisions have been taken but a growing implementation gap is becoming visible. Once the implementation gap sets in, the decline begins. We came to abolish the abominable status quo but the status quo is very much present..."Similarly, workers intensified their demands and during first months of 1972, whole country engulfed with periodic lockouts and encirclement of industries. Among them notable struggles were the emergence of a worker-led court under Abdur Rehman in Kot Lakhpat and the Karachi labour unrest of 1972.

In the field of foreign policy, the People's Party built a good relationship with China, with Bhutto successfully negotiating an aid package worth $300 million for Pakistan and also writing off loans amounting to over $110 million. On 22 February 1974, Pakistan hosted all the leaders of the Islamic world in the summit of the Organisation of Islamic Cooperation in Lahore. 
Domestically, serious issues began to emerge within the party's ranks, when Bhutto decided to utilise the state to keep an eye on the activities of the Pakistan National Alliance. After purging left wing activists from party ranks such as Malik Meraj Khalid, a Marxist law minister, Dr Mubashir Hassan also resigned. In Sept 1974, under pressure from religious outfits, Bhutto passed a constitutional amendment declaring the Ahmadiyya community to be non-Muslim. In 1973, Bhutto ordered an Army operation in the Baluchistan province against the government of the National Awami Party.

In the 1977 General Election, the People's Party won a landslide majority. However, the PNA-led opposition started demonstrations against alleged rigging in the elections. The opposition labelled Bhutto as a 'Kafir' (Unislamic) and an alcoholic, to which Bhutto responded, by saying, "Yes, I drink alcohol, but I do not drink the blood of the people." Although, in 1974, Bhutto had banned alcohol. Bhutto offered to hold another set of elections in November 1977 and offered ministries to the PNA, but this failed, sparking further civil disobedience against the Peoples Party. Tensions mounted and despite an agreement reached between the opposition and PPP, martial law was imposed in the country by Chief of Army Staff General Muhammad Zia-ul-Haq. In April 1979, after a controversial trial found him guilty of murdering a political opponent, Bhutto was executed by hanging.

In 1982, his daughter, Benazir Bhutto, was elected as the Peoples Party's co-chairperon alongside his wife, Nusrat Bhutto, who was elected in 1979. The People's Party headeded the Movement for the Restoration of Democracy which was one of the largest non-violent democratic movements in the world against the military dictatorship of General Zia-ul-Haq.

After eleven years, the People's Party returned to power by winning the 1988 General Election, with Benazir Bhutto becoming the first female head of government in the Muslim world. In 1990, the Peoples party's government was dismissed due to economic recession, issues regarding to national security and nationalisation. Benazir and the Peoples Party lost the 1990 General Election serving in opposition for the first since its inception in 1967. It was found by the Supreme Court of Pakistan in 2012 that this election had been rigged in favour of the Pakistan Muslim League.

The People's Party returned to power in the 1993 General Election, forming a coalition with JUI(F). However, over the next few years, the Party split into three main factional groups: the Bhuttoists, the Parliamentarians and the Sherpaoists, with Bhuttoism becoming the most influential and powerful in Sindh. Internal opposition and disapproval of Benazir Bhutto's policies by her brother Murtaza Bhutto created a rift in their relations. Murtaza Bhutto was assassinated in 1996, with many pointing the finger of blame at his sister.
Its effect on the Peoples Party was disastrous, whose government was dismissed by the party's own elected President Farooq Leghari in September 1996. Since 1996 and Bhutto's assassination in 2007, the Peoples Party has suffered with major internal factional conflicts, between leftists and neoliberals over the Party's shift to Thatcherite economics.

Recent history 

After the assassination of Benazir Bhutto on 27 December 2007, the 2008 parliamentary elections which were scheduled to be held in January were postponed until 18 February. The PPP won the considerable victory on among all political parties, gaining a momentum of general seats 121 from all provinces in the Parliament, whilst the centre-right, Pakistan Muslim League came second in place, managing to secure 91 seats from all over the country. In 2008, the co-chairman Asif Ali Zardari announced to end the fourth dictatorship when he quoted: "Pakistan was on its way of ridding dictatorships forever", and appealed to the Pakistan Muslim League (N) leader, former Pakistan Prime Minister Nawaz Sharif, to form a coalition controlling over half the seats in Pakistan's 342 seat parliament.

On 9 March 2008 in a press conference held in Muree, Punjab, conservatives under Nawaz Sharif and socialists led by Asif Ali Zardari officially signed an agreement to form a coalition government. Titled the PPP-PML summit declaration, the joint declaration both parties agreed on the reinstatement of judges deposed during the emergency rule imposed on 3 November 2007 by General Pervez Musharraf within 30 days after the new federal government was formed. On 28 March, the peoples party appointed Yousaf Raza Gillani for the office of prime minister and formed coalition government with Pakistan Muslim League (Q) in Punjab, Awami National Party in Khyber Pakhtunkhwa, JUI(F) in Balochistan and Muttahida Qaumi Movement in Sindh. While on other hand, the Peoples Party claimed the exclusive mandate in Gilgit-Baltistan and Kashmir. However, this treaty was later on was violated by PPP government, after which PML(N) withdrew from coalition and federal government.

On 5 September 2008, the Peoples Party nominated its co-chairman and chairman of central executive committee, Asif Ali Zardari, for the upcoming presidential election. Zardari secured 481 votes out of 700 votes from the Electoral College of Pakistan, winning the Pakistan's presidential election on 5 September 2008. In April 2010, president Zardari voluntarily surrendered his political and presidential powers to prime minister Gillani and the parliament, and through 18th Amendment to the Constitution of Pakistan, Zardari transferred the authority of government and political appointments, and powers to exercise the authority of government to prime minister Gillani as part of country's road to parliamentary democracy. Even though growing unpopularity, it has managed to maintain a large vote bank in deeper Sindh and South Punjab. On national front, it is currently competing against Pakistan Tehreek-e-Insaf and Pakistan Muslim League (N). On 22 June 2012, the PPP nominated Raja Pervez Ashraf was elected as the new Pakistan PM.

As of 2017, according to The Economist, the party "has become irrelevant outside their home province of Sindh."

On 11 April 2022, the PPP formed a coalition government with the PML-N and other parties, electing Shehbaz Sharif as Prime Minister.

Electoral history

National Assembly elections

Senate of Pakistan Elections

Sindh Assembly elections

Punjab Assembly elections

Khyber Pakhtunkhwa Assembly elections

Azad Kashmir Legislative Assembly Elections

Gilgit-Baltistan Assembly Elections

Notable leadership 
The first socialist and democratic convention attended by the leading 67 left-wing intellectuals who appointed Zulfikar Ali Bhutto as the first and founding chair of the Pakistan Peoples Party. After his execution, the senior party leadership handed over the chairmanship of the party to his wife, Nusrat Bhutto, and held the position into the 1980s. In 1982, Nusrat Bhutto, ill with cancer, was given permission to leave Pakistan for medical treatment and remained abroad for several years. At that point her daughter, Benazir Bhutto, became acting head of the party while Nusrat technically remained its chairman and was referred to as such as late as September 1983. By January 1984, Benazir was being referred to as the party's chairman and subsequently secured the legal appointment by the senior leadership of Central Executive Committee at the convention held in 1984. She had been elected chairperson for life, which she remained until her assassination on 27 December 2007. Her nineteen-year-old son, Bilawal Bhutto Zardari and his father Asif Ali Zardari were appointed party co-chairmen after assassination of Benazir Bhutto on 30 December 2007.

List of party's presidents

List of party's prime ministers

Current structure and composition 

The Central Executive Committee of the Pakistan Peoples Party of Pakistan serves as party's highest leadership, and apex governing authority, and is primarily responsible for promoting Peoples Party activities, promotion, media campaigning, welfare distribution, public policy and works. The CEC is the supreme parliamentary body in charge of setting out strategies and positions during and after elections. The CEC is currently chaired by Asif Ali Zardari, assisted by additional vice-chairmen, including all the major office bearers of the party. However, the CEC is focused on election campaigning and organizational strategy during the national parliamentary elections, overseeing the media works, ideological promotion, and the foreign policy. The public works, welfare distribution are partly managed at the municipal unit level up to the federal level, which supervise and give legal authority for such works.

The PPP-Young Organization is a youth-led party organisation that attempts to mobilise the youth for Peoples Party candidates for the Youth Parliament. The group's Trotskyist-Marxist wing, "The Struggle", which is internationally affiliated with International Marxist Tendency (IMT) pursues an entryist strategy by working inside party's student wing, the Peoples Students, a student-outreach organization with the goal of training and engaging the new generation of the Pakistan Peoples Party. The Peoples Party also has an active military-street wing, the People's Committee, controversially affiliated with the Pakistan Peoples Party.

Nationally, each province and territory has a provisional committee, made up of elected committee members as well as ex-officio committee members who elect its presidents. The local committees often coordinate campaign activities within their jurisdiction, oversee local conventions, and in some cases primaries or caucuses, and may have a role in nominating candidates for elected office under state law. All administration, campaign, and party policies required complete permission from the CEC's co-chairman and the vice-chairmen.

Ideology 
In its inception, the notable communists from the Communist Party and socialists of the defunct Socialist Party gathered to form the Peoples Party in 1967 by electing Zulfikar Ali Bhutto its first chairman. The Pakistan Peoples Party's leftist program remains far more successful and integrated in the civil society than Communist Party.

Since then, the Peoples Party has been a leading proponent of democratic socialism with the mainstream agenda of social democracy, favouring semi-secular and semi-Islamic socialist principles. Historically, the Peoples Party favoured financially stable farmers, industrial labour unions and the middle-class. The Peoples Party rejected far-left politics and ultra-leftism, supporting unregulated business and finance, and laissez-faire capitalism, after which it was no longer widely viewed as a socialist or social-democratic party, as its economic policies swung dramatically to the right-wing, embracing economic neoliberalism and unfettered capitalism and privatisation of publicly owned institutions, favouring partial income taxes.

Despite its democratic-socialist ideas, the Peoples Party never actually allied with the Soviet Union, with the Communist Party of Pakistan remaining one of its major rivals. The Peoples Party has been criticised by various socialists such as Fahad Rizwan who accused the Peoples Party of opportunism. Recently, the Peoples Party has adopted privatisation and small-scale nationalisation policies, with centrist economic and socially progressive agendas.

Basic, enshrined principles of PPP include "Islam [as] our Faith. Democracy is our Politics. Socialism is our Economy. All Power to the People".

Issues involving foreign policy 
Relations with the China, Russia, Iran and Turkey, are the central and the strongest proponents of the People's Party's foreign policy. Under Zulfikar Ali Bhutto, Pakistan built closer ties with Soviet Union, China, and Iran, but under Benazir Bhutto, the foreign policy was revised after taking shifts to centre-right policies. On the other hand, Benazir Bhutto adopted Nawaz Sharif's conservative privatisation policies in order to secure funding from the United States and the World Bank, but received a harsh opposition from within the party. Under former Prime Minister Yousaf Raza Gillani, the People's Party pushed its foreign policy towards Russia as the party's relationship with the United States went cold in 2010. Earlier in the 1970s, the People's Party faced a "secret" cold war with the United States, but then suffered a US-backed coup in 1977. Throughout the 1980s, the party's credibility was damaged by the United States who "keenly sabotaged" any of its efforts and organizational establishment in the dense areas of country.

Academia 

The Pakistan Peoples Party through Zulfikar Ali Bhutto proudly receives all credit for launching the atomic bomb project in 1972, public ceremonies are held on Youm-e-Takbir (lit. Day of Greatness) to commemorate the political services of Zulfikar Ali Bhutto who established the program.
 
In 1976, Murtaza Bhutto graduated from Harvard University, Bhutto graduated with his thesis entitled "Modicum of Harmony". His thesis dealt with the spread of nuclear weapons in general, and the implications of India's nuclear weapons on Pakistan in particular. Murtaza went on to Christ Church College Oxford, his father's alma mater, for a three-year course to read for an MLit degree. Bhutto submitted his master thesis, containing a vast argumentative work on Nuclear strategic studies, where he advocated for Pakistan's approach to develop its nuclear deterrence program to counter Indian nuclear program.

Since its establishment, the People's Party has produced prolific scientists-turned technocrats, including Farhatullah Babar, Mubashir Hassan, and the senior academic scientists who played a role in building the atomic bomb. The People's Party member's notably provided their public support to Abdul Qadeer Khan who had been forced to attend the military debriefings by General Pervez Musharraf in 2004. In August 2012, after years of negligence, the peoples party made its effort to bestowed and award Munir Ahmad Khan the highest state honor, the Nishan-e-Imtiaz, as a gesture of political rehabilitation; the honor was publicly presented by President Asif Ali Zardari in a public ceremony.

In 1995–1996, the People's Party under Benazir Bhutto's era opened computer literacy centres to provide the public with access to computers and technology. In 1990, they made Pakistan the first Muslim country to launch a satellite, Badr-I, they are also responsible for establishing, nurturing, and funding the missile's programs, such as Ghauri and Shaheen in the 1990s. As part of the science policy, they established the Pakistan Science Foundation in 1973 and helped establish the Pakistan Academy of Letters in 1976. In 1996, Benazir Bhutto established SZABIST at Karachi to become a leading institution of science and technology and appointed world-renowned academic Dr. Javaid Laghari as its first president, who later was also elected Senator from Sindh on a technocrat seat and eventually Chairman HEC leading a revolution of reforms in higher education in South Asia

Challenges and controversies

Lost left 
Since the 1990s, the People's Party has been under intense criticism even inside the party both from its own members and the other leftists in the country, notably due to the charges of large-scale corruptions. The leading leftist, Nadeem Paracha, has asserted that since 1977 the People's Party's manifesto has been transformed into a centre-right platform, whereas in 1977 parliamentary elections, the People's Party's manifesto did not mention the word "socialism". During the 1973–75, the Peoples Party's radical ultra-left and communist wings led by Mirage Khalid and the Maoist wings under Khalid Syed were purged by the People's Party to ensure the political support of the powerful Sindh's feudal lords and Punjab's landed elite, with Paracha claiming the People's Party has "lost the left".

Leading left-wing journalist Mehdi Hasan has remarked that the Peoples Party is "not a secular party", firstly citing its support of declaring Ahmadiyya community as non-Muslims through the second constitutional amendment, secondly for banning the use of liquor, and thirdly for the Peoples Party declaring Friday as a holiday to win the support of religious elements.

Kashmir Cause 
The chairman of PPP Bilawal Bhutto Zardari led a convention on 19 September 2014 in Multan, Punjab, where he reportedly quoted: "the [PPP] would take back entire Kashmir for his country."

Bhutto emphasized on his last part of the speech: "I will take back Kashmir, all of it, and I will not leave behind a single inch of it because like the other provinces, it belongs to Pakistan. He pledged to continue supporting Kashmiri freedom struggle morally and diplomatically...(.)".

Internal opposition and factionalism 

Since the 1990s, the factionalism has grew in the party when Murtaza Bhutto returned to Pakistan. Disagreeing with Benazir and Asif Ali Zardari's political philosophy brewing the party, Murtaza Bhutto split and formed the more powerful yet more leaning towards left wing faction, Bhuttoist in 1995. Confrontation with Benazir Bhutto in 1999 over the party guidance, Aftab Sherpao splits from the party and forming the Pakistan Peoples Party (Sherpaoist)—a more reformist with libertarian agenda.

Factionalism continued in 2011 when PPP sacked Mahmood Qureshi over the Raymond Davis incident in Lahore. Qureshi later defected to PTI. Another leftist leader, Malik Ali Khan also resigned from the Peoples Party, saying that he "did not agree with how President Zardari was leading the party particularly with regards to an alliance with centre-right PML (Q) and the foreign policy."

In 2012, the PPP's powerful leader, Zulfiqar Mirza, quit from the party despite urgings amidst disagreement with Asif Zardari's leadership and policies with regards to dealings with the liberal MQM in Sindh. Reasoning with their isolation, the socialist politicians felt that the party had now moved away from the original ideas it was founded on by Zulfikar Ali Bhutto in 1967. In 2014, Labour leader, Safdar Ali Abbasi, formed the Workers faction amid disagreement with party's fiscal policy.

Defection in PPP: The Launch of Pakistan People's Party Parliamentarian-Patriots 
The Pakistan People's Party Parliamentarian-Patriots (PPPPP) was launched in Lahore in the year 2002 as a 'forward bloc' that broke away from the PPP to back the Pakistan Muslim League Quaid-e-Azam (PML-Q) transforming itself into Pakistan's newest party at that time. The leader of the rebel group was Makhdoom Faisal Saleh Hayat. In January 2017, Former federal minister Syed Faisal Saleh Hayat joined the Pakistan Peoples Party on Monday, more than 14 years after being elected on the PPP ticket in 2002, bringing an end to the PPPPP.

See also 

 Bhuttoism and Sindhi culture
 Roti Kapda Aur Makaan
 Radical left factions in the Pakistan Peoples Party
 Pakistan Peoples Party (Bhuttoist)
 Pakistan Peoples Party (Marxism)
 Pakistan Peoples Party (Parliamentarians)
 Pakistan Peoples Party (Workers)
 Political realism
 Socialism in Pakistan

References

Further reading

External links 

 Pakistan Peoples Party Pakistan based Web site
 Pakistan Peoples Party USA official site
 The Pakistan People's Party, Radio France Internationale (in English)
 A detailed Web site on the life of Zulfikar Ali Bhutto
 2008 Election dossier, Radio France Internationale (in English)

 
1967 establishments in Pakistan
Full member parties of the Socialist International
Islamic socialist political parties
Liberal parties in Pakistan
Progressivism in Pakistan
Centre-left parties in Asia
Social democratic parties in Pakistan